"Luz Sin Gravedad" (English: "Light Without Gravity"), is the third official single from Belinda's second studio album Utopía. The English version, "See a Little Light", was released as the second single from the international release of the album.

Music video 
The video begins in a ballet class where Belinda is having problems dancing. Her teacher pushes her and yells at her. Belinda's peers begin to laugh at her and she leaves the class. She walks the streets in her tutu, and is pushed by people. It then starts to rain and she begins to dance again. Belinda also plays the piano in the video. The video was released on March 13, 2007. The English version has some scenes re-recorded to fit in the language and was released March, 2008. Both versions were directed by Scott Speer.

Track listing 
Maxi Single
(B0016UJYG4; Released April 21, 2008)
 "See A Little Light" - 4:04  
 "Luz Sin Gravedad" - 4:01  
 "If We Were" (Acoustic) - 3:29
 "See A Little Light" (Acoustic) - 4:09

Brazilian digital download
 "Luz Sin Gravedad" - 4:01
 "See A Little Light" - 4:04
 "See A Little Light" (Acoustic) - 4:09
 "Es De Verdad" - 3:36
 "Your Hero" (feat. Finley) - 4:00
 "Never Enough" - 3:10

Charts

Official versions 
 Luz Sin Gravedad (Album Version)
 See A Little Light (Album Version)
 See A Little Light (Acoustic Version)

References 

2007 singles
2008 singles
Belinda Peregrín songs
Spanish-language songs
Music videos directed by Scott Speer
Black-and-white music videos
Pop ballads
Songs written by Belinda Peregrín
Songs written by Jimmy Harry
Songs written by Nacho Peregrín
2006 songs
EMI Televisa Music singles
English-language Mexican songs
Song recordings produced by Jimmy Harry